Admiral is a senior rank of the Royal Navy of the United Kingdom, which equates to the NATO rank code OF-9, formally outranked only by the rank admiral of the fleet. The rank of admiral is currently the highest rank to which an officer in the Royal Navy can be promoted, admiral of the fleet being used nowadays only for honorary promotions.

This list aims to include all who have been promoted to the rank of admiral in the Royal Navy of the United Kingdom following the Acts of Union 1707, or to historical variations of that rank (the main article on the rank includes a history of the rank, including the pre-1864 use of colour for admirals of the various squadrons).

Royal Navy officers holding the ranks of rear admiral, vice admiral and admiral of the fleet are sometimes considered generically to be admirals. These are not listed here unless they gained the rank of full admiral.

For a very long time promotion to the ranks above captain was an entitlement of everyone who had become a captain and occurred in strict order of seniority as captain; this was enacted in 1718 and is still evident in Navy Lists of the 1940s. Various stratagems were developed to move those who had seniority over captains who it was actually desired to promote out of the way of the functional promotions, including promotion "without distinction of squadron", "dormant commissions", "superannuation", a variety of pension schemes, a "reserved list", and a "retired list";
these were frequently enacted by Order in Council. Despite being moved off the active list vice-admirals could still be promoted to admiral after all previously promoted vice admirals of their category had been promoted or died, whether on an honorific basis or as a means of granting them a pension increase.

Persons listed are shown with the titles they held at the time of their deaths whether or not these were held at the time of their promotion to the rank of full admiral.
Those who only held the rank of full admiral on an acting basis are not shown.

List of admirals

See also
 List of senior officers of the Royal Navy
 List of British Army full generals
 List of Royal Marines full generals
 List of Royal Air Force air chief marshals
 List of Royal Navy vice admirals
 List of Royal Navy rear admirals

References

External links
 List of Royal Navy Senior Staff

Admirals
 
Lists of admirals